William Harvey Gourley  (13 February 1933 – 25 August 2008) was a major general in the United States Army. He served as Commanding General of the 1st Personnel Command.

Born and raised in Philadelphia, Gourley attended Temple University and participated in the Army ROTC program there. He earned a B.S. degree in management from Temple and was commissioned a second lieutenant in 1955. Gourley later earned an M.B.A. degree from Indiana University in 1964.

During his military career, Gourley was deployed to Germany, Vietnam, Turkey and South Korea. He retired from active duty on 31 November 1989.

Gourley moved to Monterey, California after his retirement and became involved in planning the civilian reuse of Fort Ord after it was closed in 1994. As a result of his efforts, the Major General William H. Gourley VA-DoD Outpatient Clinic was opened in Marina, California in 2017.

Personal
Gourley was the son of Harry Evans Gourley (1898–1972) and Mary Jane (Sheppard) Gourley (1898–1979). He had a sister and a brother.

Gourley married Mary Quarrier "Molly" Morris (18 September 1932 – 14 March 2008) in 1957. They had a son, three daughters and nine grandchildren. Gourley and his wife were interred at Arlington National Cemetery.

References

1933 births
2008 deaths
Military personnel from Philadelphia
Temple University alumni
United States Army personnel of the Vietnam War
Kelley School of Business alumni
Recipients of the Meritorious Service Medal (United States)
Recipients of the Legion of Merit
United States Army generals
Recipients of the Distinguished Service Medal (US Army)
Burials at Arlington National Cemetery